The Quebec Writers' Federation Awards are a series of Canadian literary awards, presented annually by the Quebec Writers' Federation to the best works of literature in English by writers from Quebec. They were known from 1988 to 1998 as the QSPELL Awards.

Categories

They are currently presented in seven literary categories:
 Paragraphe Hugh MacLennan Prize for Fiction,
 Mavis Gallant Prize for Non-Fiction
 A. M. Klein Prize for Poetry
 Concordia University First Book Prize
 QWF Prize for Children's & Young Adult Literature
 Cole Foundation Prize for Translation (French and English, with target language alternating each year)
 3Macs Carte Blanche Prize for the best work published in the QWF's online literary journal Carte Blanche.

A Community Award is also frequently presented to a person who has played a significant role in building and supporting Quebec's anglophone writing community.

The awards have been presented annually since 1988.

Winners

Janet Savage Blachford Prize for Children's and Young Adult Literature 
The Janet Savage Blachford Prize, established in 2008, is presented annually for children's and young adult books. Picture books with text and books intended for beginner readers are eligible in even-numbered years, whereas books intended for middle grade or young adult readers are eligible in odd-numbered years. The award was established in 2008, was sponsored by sponsored by Janet and John Blachford beginning in 2014, and has been sponsored in the memory of Janet Savage Blachford since 2018.

carte blanche Prize 
The carte blanche Prize, established in 2008, is awarded annual "in recognition of an outstanding submission to QWF’s online literary journal, carte blanche, by a Quebec writer, artist, or translator. Winners receive a cash prize and a unique trophy—'The Lori'—created by Montreal artist Glen LeMesurier."

The Cole Foundation Prize for Translation 
The Cole Foundation Prize for Translation, also known as Le Prix de traduction de la Fondation Cole and established in 1998, is awarded annually to books written by an English-language Quebec writer or an English-language Quebec translator of a book by a French author. English-language Quebec writers are eligible in even-numbered years, whereas English-language Quebec translators are eligible in odd-numbered years.

Concordia University First Book Prize 
The Concordia University First Book Prize, established in 1996 and sponsored by Concordia University, is awarded annually to the first book of an English-language Quebec writer. The award has been known as the First Book Award (1996 – 1998), McAuslan First Book Prize (1999 – 2009), the QWF First Book Prize (2010),  and the Concordia University First Book Prize (2011 – present).

Mavis Gallant Prize for Non-Fiction 
The Mavis Gallant Prize for Non-Fiction, established in 1988, is awarded annually to an English-language non-fiction book written by a Quebec author. The award was original named the Non-fiction Prize, though it changed in 1999.

Judy Mappin Community Award 
The Judy Mappin Community Award, established in 1995 and first awarded to Judith Mappin, is awarded annually "to a member of the extended literary community who has made a significant and longstanding contribution to the development and/or dissemination of English-language literature in Quebec."

A. M. Klein Prize for Poetry 
The A. M. Klein Prize for Poetry, established in 1988, is awarded annually to a book of English-language poetry written by a Quebec poet. The prize was known as the Poetry Prize from 1988 to 1922. From 2011 to 2015, the prize was sponsored by Richard Pound, in memory of his brother Robert, and in 2022, it was sponsored by Byron Rempel.

Max Margles Fiction Prize 
The Max Margles Fiction Prize, established in 2022, is presented to a new English-language Quebec writer "to allow a writer to work uninterruptedly on a manuscript for four months." It is "the largest such prize to be awarded by any Canadian provincial writers’ organization."

Paragraphe Hugh MacLennan Prize for Fiction 
The Paragraphe Hugh MacLennan Prize for Fiction, established in 1988, is presented annually to an English-language Quebec writer of fiction.

QWF Playwriting Prize 
The QWF Playwriting Prize, established in 2018, is award every other year in even-numbered years. Typically, plays published "published or produced during the two previous years" are eligible. However, due to the COVID-19 pandemic's impact on theatre, plays have been eligible for the award if they have been published or produced since 2018, "provided that the play was not already submitted for the 2020 prize."

The QWF Playwriting Prize winner received a $3,000 prize, as well as "a reading as part of Infinithéâtre’s Pipeline Reading Series."

QWF Spoken Word Prize 
The QWF Spoken Word Prize, established in 2022, "is open to Quebec-based spoken word artists, storytelling artists, and literary performance artists working primarily in English in any form of performative writing."

References

External links 
 Quebec Writers' Federation Awards

Quebec Anglophone culture
Quebec awards
Awards established in 1988
1988 establishments in Quebec
Canadian fiction awards
Canadian non-fiction literary awards
Canadian poetry awards
Translation awards
Canadian children's literary awards
First book awards
English-language literary awards